Robert Aldrich (1918–1983) was an American film director

Robert Aldrich may also refer to:
 Robert Aldrich (bishop) (died 1555), the Bishop of Carlisle
 Robert Aldrich (historian) (born 1954), Australian historian

See also 
 Robert Andrich (born 1994), a German footballer